A tower array is an arrangement of multiple radio towers which are mast radiators in a phased array. They were originally developed as ground-based tracking radars. Tower arrays can consist of free-standing or guyed towers or a mix of them. Tower arrays are used to constitute a directional antenna of a mediumwave or longwave radio station.

The number of towers in a tower array can vary.
In many arrays all towers have the same height, but there are also arrays of towers of different height. The arrangement can vary. For directional antennas with fixed radiation pattern, linear arrangements are preferred, while for switchable directional patterns (usually for daytime groundwave versus nighttime skywave), square arrangements are chosen.

Examples

Tower arrays with guyed masts
 Longwave transmitter Europe 1
 Transmitter Weisskirchen
 Beidweiler Longwave Transmitter
 Transmitter Wachenbrunn
 Transmitter Ismaning (VoA-Station)

Tower arrays with free standing towers
 Junglinster Longwave Transmitter
 Orfordness transmitting station

See also
 Directional antenna
 Directional array
 Longwave
 Medium wave

References

Broadcast engineering
Telecommunications equipment
Telecommunications infrastructure
Communication towers
Radio frequency antenna types
Antennas (radio)